The 2022 Southeastern Conference men's basketball tournament was the postseason men's basketball tournament for the 2021–22 Southeastern Conference men's basketball season, held on March 9–13, 2022 at the Amalie Arena in Tampa, Florida. The winner, the Tennessee Volunteers, received the conference's automatic bid to the 2022 NCAA tournament.

Seeds 
All 14 SEC teams participated in the tournament. Teams were seeded by record within the conference, with a tiebreaker system to seed teams with identical conference records. The top 10 teams received a first round bye and the top four teams received a double bye, automatically advancing them into the quarterfinals.

Schedule

Bracket

* – Denotes overtime period

Game summaries

First round

Second round

Quarterfinals

Semifinals

Final

See also 

 2022 SEC women's basketball tournament

References 

Tournament
SEC men's basketball tournament
Basketball competitions in Florida
College sports in Florida
Sports competitions in Tampa, Florida
SEC men's basketball tournament
SEC men's basketball tournament